Ľubomír Dinda (born June 30, 1994) is a Slovak professional ice hockey defenceman. He is currently a free agent having last played for Diables Rouges de Briançon of the Ligue Magnus.

Previously, Dinda has played in 261 regular season games for HK Poprad of the Tipsport Liga from 2012 to 2018. On May 17, 2018, Dinda moved to France to join Lions de Lyon of the Ligue Magnus. On September 2, 2019, he moved to fellow Magnus side Diables Rouges de Briançon. Dinda was released by the team on January 30, 2020 following a back injury.

References

External links

1994 births
Living people
Diables Rouges de Briançon players
LHC Les Lions players
People from Kežmarok
Sportspeople from the Prešov Region
HK Poprad players
HC Prešov players
Slovak ice hockey defencemen
HK Spišská Nová Ves players
Expatriate ice hockey players in France
Slovak expatriate ice hockey people
Slovak expatriate sportspeople in France